Pacific Union School District is a public school district in Fresno, Fresno County, California, United States.

References

External links
 

School districts in Fresno County, California